Lutz's gecko (Phyllopezus lutzae), also known commonly as Bogert's gecko and Lutz' marked gecko, is a species of lizard in the family Phyllodactylidae. The species is endemic to Brazil.

Etymology
The specific name, lutzae, is in honor of Brazilian herpetologist Bertha Lutz. The original generic name, Bogertia, was in honor of American herpetologist Charles Mitchill Bogert.

Geographic range
P. lutzae is found in northeastern Brazil, in the Brazilian states of Bahia, Paraíba, and Pernambuco.

Habitat
The preferred natural habitat of P. lutzae is forest.

Behavior
P. lutzae is terrestrial, and it is both diurnal and nocturnal.

Defensive behavior
If threatened, P. lutzae may vocalize, and it may shed its tail (autotomy).

Diet
P. lutzae preys upon arthropods, mainly spiders and beetles. Its diet varies ontogenetically and seasonally.

Reproduction
P. lutzae is oviparous.

Taxonomy
Based on DNA analysis, Gamble et al. (2012) placed this species in the genus Phyllopezus, along with three other described species and several undescribed species.

References

Further reading
Albuquerque PRA, Morais MSR, Moura PTS, Santos WNS, Costa RMT, Delfim FR, Pontes BES (2019). "Phyllopezus lutzae (Loveridge, 1941) (Squamata, Phyllodactylidae): new records from the Brazilian state of Paraíba". Check List 15 (1): 49–53.
Freitas MA (2014). "Squamate reptiles of the Atlantic Forest of northern Bahia, Brazil". Check List 10 (5): 1020–1030.
Rösler H (2000). "Kommentierte Liste der rezent, subrezent und fossil bekannten Gekkotaxa (Reptilia: Gekkonomorpha)". Gekkota 2: 28–153. (Bogertia lutzae, p. 61). (in German).

Phyllopezus
Reptiles described in 1941

nl:Bogertia